Indiana Area School District is a public school district in Indiana County, Pennsylvania. It is composed of White Township and Armstrong Township, along with Indiana and Shelocta boroughs.

Elementary schools
The Indiana Area School District has four elementary schools. Two of these serve for grades K-3, and two serving for grades 4–5, and each serving a different part of the district. Ben Franklin Elementary School (K-3) and Dwight D. Eisenhower Elementary School (4-5) serve Shelocta, Armstrong Township, west-central White Township, mostly the northwest corner of White Township, but also a small strip of western and southwestern White Township and the western third of Indiana Borough. East Pike Elementary School (K-3) and Horace Mann Elementary School (4-5) serve the eastern third of White Township, the northeastern corner of Indiana Borough, southern Indiana Borough and south-central and most of southwestern White Township.

Secondary schools
IASD has two secondary schools. Indiana Area Junior High School (IJHS) contains grades 6-8, and Indiana Area Senior High School (IHS) contains grades 9-12.

Demographics
Approximately 32,000 people live in the IASD, and 3,000 students enroll in the district. The average graduation rate is 92%, and the average graduating class contains 250 students. Approximately 76% of all graduates enroll in some sort of post-secondary education. As of 2005, district employs 257 staff members, 202 of whom have their master's degree or above. On average, each staff member has 17 years of experience with the district.

Academics
The IASD consistently demonstrates that it is in the top tier of public school districts. Recently, it was ranked as one of the top 100 school districts by Offspring Magazine.

Standardized tests
The IASD does especially well on standardized tests. It was once ranked third, out of 501 school districts, in scores on the Pennsylvania System of School Assessment given to all 5th, 8th, and 11th grade students, and has received numerous accolades for its journalism and social studies programs, including a $349,000 grant given to the senior high school's history program. In addition, graduating classes have averaged up to 40 more points on the Scholastic Aptitude Test than the national average.

Post-secondary education
Each class graduates nearly 80% of its students into post-secondary education. Most attend Indiana University of Pennsylvania, located within the district. IASD also consistently sends students into three leading local universities, Carnegie Mellon University, Pennsylvania State University and the University of Pittsburgh. IASD alumni have also entered Massachusetts Institute of Technology, Rice University, the United States Naval Academy, the United States Military Academy, Harvard University, Cornell University, the University of Pennsylvania, Bucknell University, the University of Virginia, the University of Richmond, the University of Notre Dame, Case Western Reserve University, James Madison University, New York University, Manhattan School of Music, Villanova University, the Johns Hopkins School of Medicine, and The Juilliard School. Many students who do not go on to post-secondary education choose to join the United States Marine Corps.

Extracurricular Programs
IASD offers a variety of extracurricular activities, the chief among them being sports. The junior and senior high school also offer clubs, with a majority of students participating in them.

Clubs
Both IJHS and IHS offer club programs for students. The largest among them is a volunteer club, Builders' Club at IJHS and Key Club at IHS. Key Club counts about 25% of the IHS student body as members. At IHS, there is also Future Business Leaders of America, Relay For Life and many theater clubs among its 20+ clubs.

Sports
The entire district offers a wide variety of sports. The elementary schools have basketball, grouped by sex and grade. At the end of each school year, each school stages an "All-School Tournament," in which all players are eligible. IJHS offers students football, soccer, track and field, cross country and girls' volleyball for the first time in school. IHS has even more selection. Boys' baseball, girls' softball, winter track and field, tennis, golf, rifle, hockey and swimming and diving.

Ben Franklin's colors are green and gold, and the teams are known as the Braves. Eisenhower's colors are blue and gold, and the teams are known as the Eagles. East Pike's colors are red and white, and the teams there are known as the Chiefs. Horace Mann's colors are red and white, and teams there are known as the Warriors.

The colors of the junior and senior high schools are red and black, and the team name is the "Indians." Their fight song is "Cherokee." This is taken from the Indiana University of Pennsylvania's sports teams, which were known as the "Indians," and their fight song was "Cherokee" as well. In general, most sports teams are outfitted in white uniforms, but the football team also wears blood-red and black jerseys and pants; the softball team wears gray, pinstriped uniforms; the basketball teams also wear black uniforms; and the hockey team has red, black and white uniforms.

Generally, the cross country, swimming and diving, boys tennis, ice hockey and boys and girls' and boys' basketball and track and field teams are Indiana's strongest teams. The boys basketball team won the Class AAA WPIAL Championship in 2014–2015 season. The ice hockey team won the PIHL D-2 championship in the 2014–15 season  And their first ever Penguins Cup Championship and State Championship appearance in the 2020-2021 season. During the 2018 season, the IHS men's cross country team was the PIAA state runner-up in the AA division. The hockey team competes in the Pennsylvania Interscholastic Hockey League, while all other teams compete in the Western Pennsylvania Interscholastic Athletic League, or WPIAL.

Additionally, several IHS athletes have gone on to participate in post-secondary sports teams in various sports, such as basketball, football, softball, cross country, track and field, and swimming. One IHS alum, Joey Bujdos, earned 22 varsity letters in only 4 years of attending the Indiana Area Senior High School, participating in the sports golf, cross country, swimming, indoor track and field, tennis, and spring track and field. A Pittsburgh Post-Gazette reported called Bujdos, "...possibly be the most unique athlete in WPIAL history."

Student Councils
Student councils/governments are available for students in both the Indiana Area Junior and Senior High School to participate in. In the Junior High School, the student council organization is known as the Student Council, or STUCO for short. In the IHS, the student council organization is known as the Student Government Association or SGA for short. Students must maintain a set grade point average in order to participate in the latter organization.

IJHS Student Council (STUCO)
Students in grades 6-8 are eligible to participate in the Junior High Student Council. The Student Council is a student-led organization dedicated to benefitting the Indiana Junior High School. The Student Council is primarily led by a president and vice president elected each year, along with several other important positions.

IHS Student Government Association (SGA) 
Students attending the Indiana Area Senior High School can be admitted into the Student Government Association. This organization helps set up the school's annual Teddy Bear Fund Drive and the annual Red Cross blood drive.

Notable alumni
 Authors Edward Abbey and Tawni O'Dell .
 American Football League running back Jim Nance .
 Vocalist Edward Parks of the Metropolitan Opera.
 Phil Kuehn , a professional bassist.
 Joe Saylor , a professional jazz percussionist for the band Stay Human .
 John Kopchick
 Christine Toretti S.W. Jack Drilling Co.

References

External links

School districts in Indiana County, Pennsylvania
Indiana, Pennsylvania